Nagraj ( King of Snakes) is a 2018 Indian Bhojpuri-language action drama film directed by Dinesh Yadav, produced by Deepak Shah under Tanvi Multimedia production banner, Distribute by RN Motion Pictures. It stars Yash Kumarr, Anjana Singh and Payas Pandit. The film is a sequel to the 2016 film Ichhadhari.

Plot
A shapeshifting-snake (Hindi: Ichchhadhari Nag) couple (Yash Kumarr and Anjana Singh) comes to earth to live a happy life but not for so long because a tantric, who assumes himself to be a part of Lord Shiv, sends his shapeshifting she-snake (Paysi Pandit) to woo the male from the couple, taking advantage of her beauty, which leads to numerous other circumstances and fighting sequences. Ultimately, the couple gets captured by the tantric.

Cast
Yash Kumarr
Anjana Singh
Payas Pandit
Sushil Singh

Music

Production

The film was shot on the mountains of Mirzapur and Chunar from Uttar Pradesh, India. Help of Hollywood technicians was taken during the film's production and it uses animation and visual effects on a wide scale.

Release

Marketing
First-look poster was released on 1 January 2018. Trailer of the film was released on 11 May 2018 to official YouTube sub-handle of Enterr 10 who also bought its satellite rights.

Release history

Reception
Upon release of the film's trailer, it garnered heavy positive response. The character of tantric reminds of Amrish Puri's role in 1986 film Nagina and Paysi Pandit's bad-ass woman role has been compared with Kangana Ranaut's role in Krrish 3 in which she stretches her tongue to tangle her enemies.

References

Indian sequel films
Indian action drama films
2010s Bhojpuri-language films
2018 action drama films
Films about snakes
Films about shapeshifting
Indian superhero films
Indian superheroes